The Suwannee snapping turtle (Macrochelys suwanniensis) is a species of very large freshwater turtle in the family Chelydridae. This species is endemic to the southeastern United States, where it only inhabits the Suwannee River basin.

Taxonomy 
It is one of only two known species in the genus Macrochelys, the other being the far more widespread alligator snapping turtle (M. temminckii); a third, the Apalachicola snapping turtle (M. apalachicolae), which was described alongside M. suwanniensis, is not thought to be distinct from M. temminckii and has been synonymized with it. It was previously believed to represent a population of Macrochelys temminckii, but a 2014 study found significant genetic divergence between the Suwannee and alligator snapping turtles, dating back to the late Miocene to early Pliocene, about 5.5 to 13.4 million years ago, and thus the Suwannee population was described as a distinct species, M. suwanniensis.

Distribution and habitat 
This species is only found in the Suwannee River basin, in southern Georgia and northern portions of peninsular Florida; it is allopatric with respect to M. temminckii, which inhabits river basins further to the west. It inhabits only riparian habitats such as rivers and their tributaries, but sometimes utilizes backwater swamps and oxbow lakes. Individuals found in inland lakes have likely been introduced. In 2021, an individual was discovered in the Okefenokee Swamp, indicating that a previously-undocumented population of snapping turtles may inhabit the swamp.

Threats 
Due to its slow generation time, it is highly vulnerable to direct stressors such as turtle hunting (illegal in Florida) and indirect stressors such as habitat destruction, which pollutes the water it inhabits. In 2021, the U.S. Fish and Wildlife Service proposed listing the species under the Endangered Species Act.

References

Chelydridae
Reptiles described in 2014
Reptiles of the United States
Aquatic reptiles